
Blyth's reed warbler (Acrocephalus dumetorum) is an Old World warbler in the genus Acrocephalus. It breeds in the Palearctic and easternmost Europe. It is migratory, wintering in Bangladesh, India and Sri Lanka. It is one of the most common winter warblers in those countries. It is a rare vagrant to western Europe.

Etymology
This bird is named after the British zoologist Edward Blyth. The genus name Acrocephalus is from Ancient Greek akros, "highest", and kephale, "head". It is possible that Naumann and Naumann thought akros meant "sharp-pointed". The specific dumetorum is from Latin dumetum, "thicket".

Description
This small passerine bird is a species found in scrub or clearings, often near water, but it is not found in marshes. 4-6 eggs are laid in a nest in a bush. 

This is a medium-sized warbler,  in length. The adult has a plain brown back and pale underparts. It can easily be confused with the reed warbler, the marsh warbler and some of the Hippolais warblers. It is most like the reed warbler but is greyer on the back, the forehead is less flattened and the bill is less strong and pointed. The sexes are identical, as with most warblers, but young birds are yellower below.

Habitat
The habitat of Blyth's reed warbler is different from the reedbeds favoured by the reed warbler or the rank vegetation of the marsh warbler: this species chooses trees or bushes as songposts. Like most warblers, it is insectivorous, but will take other small food items, including berries.

In the breeding season, the best identification feature is the song, which is slow and repetitive, with much mimicry of other birds, punctuated with scales and typically acrocephaline whistles.

References

Further reading

Identification
 Golley, Mark and Richard Millington (1996) Identification of Blyth's Reed Warbler in the field. Birding World 9(9): 351-353
 Vinicombe, Keith (2002) Identification matters: Acrocephalus. Birdwatch 124:27-30

Blyth's reed warbler
Birds of Europe
Birds of Russia
Birds of Central Asia
Blyth's reed warbler
Blyth's reed warbler